Mathieu Jomphe-Lepine (born 1988), also known as Billboard, is a Canadian music producer, songwriter, and engineer. He is based in Montreal, Quebec. He has been nominated for a Grammy award for "Call Your Girlfriend" by Robyn in 2011, "You Should Be Here" by Kehlani in 2015, and "Dangerous Woman" by Ariana Grande in 2016. He also releases original music and visual art through his dedicated artist project, Mont Duamel.

Discography

Singles

Full discography

References

1986 births
Canadian record producers
Living people
People from Montreal